Anathamna is a genus of moths belonging to the subfamily Olethreutinae of the family Tortricidae.

Species
Anathamna anthostoma Meyrick, 1928
Anathamna chionopyra Diakonoff, 1953
Anathamna megalozona Meyrick, 1916
Anathamna neospermatophaga Pooni & Rose, 2005
Anathamna ostracitis Meyrick, 1911
Anathamna plana Meyrick, 1911
Anathamna syringias Meyrick, 1911

See also
List of Tortricidae genera

References

External links
tortricidae.com

Tortricidae genera
Olethreutinae
Taxa named by Edward Meyrick